Metheg-ammah ( Meṯeḡ hā’Ammāh) is a biblical word or phrase that has caused some difficulty for biblical scholars and translators.

The whole of  lists David's conquests after he became king of the United Monarchy and therefore in some translations of the Bible it is treated as a location which he is said to have captured from the Philistines. 

An alternate understanding is that this is not a proper name but a Hebrew phrase meaning "bridge of the mother-city" (e.g. Revised Version), which would refer to the Philistine capital at Gath. The parallel text at  refers to Gath and this interpretation is followed also by the NLT, ASV, and NASB. The Pulpit Commentary argues that "Metheg-ammah" means "the bridle of the mother city". We learn from the parallel place (1 Chronicles 18:1) that the city of Gath is meant by this phrase. Gath was at this time the metropolis of Philistia, and had reduced the other four chief towns to a state of vassalage. Thus by taking Gath, his old city of refuge, David acquired also the supremacy which he had previously exercised over the whole country".

Some other translations (e.g. Jerusalem Bible, NABRE) leave the word untranslated; for example, the NABRE version has the text as:
After this, David defeated the Philistines and subdued them; and David took … from the Philistines.
and states that "the original Hebrew seems irretrievable".

References

Hebrew words and phrases in the Hebrew Bible